George W. Loughman (December 25, 1846 – February 28, 1909) served in the U.S. Army during the American Civil War, was a businessman, and served two terms as mayor of South Bend, Indiana (1884 - 1888). He was also on the town council and an auditor for the county.

Early life
Loughman was born on December 25, 1846, in Brownsville, Ohio to David and Elizabeth Loughman.

Career
Loughman served in Company G of the 32nd Ohio Infantry Regiment. He served two years and was present during Sherman's March to the Sea in Georgia.

He worked for a railroad and eventually became president and general manager of Sandage Steel Skein Company. He was a member of the Republican Party. The city had steady growth during his administration. In 1905 he was set to lead the Columbus Skein & Iron Works. He served as president of the South Bend Building and Loan Association.

Loughman was appointed Deputy St. Joseph County Auditor, a role in which he served until 1892. He was later elected St. Joseph County Auditor, serving from 1898 to 1903.

Personal life
Loughman died on February 28, 1909, at his home at 716 South Michigan Street in South Bend. He was buried at Riverview Cemetery in South Bend.

See also
List of mayors of South Bend, Indiana

References

External links

1846 births
1909 deaths
People from Licking County, Ohio
Mayors of South Bend, Indiana
Military personnel of the American Civil War
Indiana Republicans